Moses Harman (October 12, 1830January 30, 1910) was an American schoolteacher and publisher notable for his staunch support for women's rights. He was prosecuted under the Comstock Law for content published in his anarchist periodical Lucifer the Lightbearer. He was arrested and jailed multiple times for publishing allegedly obscene material. His daughter, Lillian Harman, was also a notable anarchist.

Biography
Moses Harman was born on October 12, 1830 in Pendleton County, West Virginia to Job and Nancy Harman. Their family later moved to Crawford County, Missouri. Harman taught subscription school courses and attended Arcadia College. After completing his schoolwork, Harman worked as a Methodist circuit rider and teacher.

Harman married Susan Scheuck in 1866. Although they had several children, only two survived and Susan died in childbirth in 1877. Harman left the ministry and began his involvement with eugenics and social reform following Susan's death. In 1881, Harman edited the Kansas Liberal newspaper in Valley Falls, Kansas. 

Harman has been credited as one of the founders of what became the eugenics movement. "He gave the spur and start to this effort. Through his journals, Lucifer, the Light Bearer, later renamed The American Journal of Eugenics, encouraged by a small circle of earnest men and women, he dug down below the surface endeavoring to bring forth a stronger and better type of men".

In 1881, Harman co-edited the Valley Falls Liberal, and eventually became the editor. On August 24, 1883, Harman changed the name of the publication to Lucifer, the Light Bearer. He moved the location of the newspaper several times for financial and philosophical reasons: to Topeka, Kansas in 1890, to Chicago in 1896, and to Los Angeles in 1908. The name of the paper also changed to The American Journal of Eugenics in 1906.

Articles published in Lucifer discussed topics such as religion, relationships, and raising children. Through his work, Harman rejected all forms of religion and government, including marriage, and promoted freedom, love, wisdom, and the use of knowledge. Due to the radical nature of his views and publication, Harman constantly dealt with lawsuits, charges of immorality, ridicule, and issues with mailing what was considered obscene material through the United States Postal Service. Consequently, Harman was sentenced and released by courts several times in the 1890s.

He died on January 30, 1910, aged 79, in Los Angeles.

Work In Lucifer 
Harman as the primary writer for the paper Lucifer The Light-Bearer expressed many political opinions in his writing. The primary focus of the paper was the discussion of women's rights especially in regards to marriage as he viewed it as the subjugation of women by men and the state. The paper was home to many letters, petitions and articles that discussed societal and political changes for women in America. One such contribution was from Lois Waisbrooker and was a declaration of independence for women that prescribed societal expectations and rule upon men and women.Whereas:-Man, as a sex, has no more right to make laws and insist upon our obedience than we, as a sex, have to make laws and insist upon his obedience, and

Whereas:-The race lives upon the heart's blood of woman daring its prenatal existence, thus making the character of its individual members largely dependent upon conditions surrounding her, and

Whereas:-Woman herself can best understand the conditions needed for her work as mother of the race, and

Whereas:-The present institutions of society are not adapted to woman's freedom,

Therefore we the undersigned, hereby repudiate man's role over as, demanding the right to ourselves and such a re-adjustment of conditions as will enable us to do our Best Work for the human race. Contributions such as this were representative of the level of political change that Harman advocated for. The church was another area of society that Harman targeted in Lucifer through his support of other likeminded activists such as the writer/activist Matilda Joslyn Gage. Gage argued that the church's influence over the state had created the societal chains upon women that bound them to an unjust system, and the acts of the church to care for abandoned children only was necessary because of the societal pressures that church imposed on women and through them their children. Harman's political activism often put him at risk of law suits and led to multiple jail sentences but despite the risks and costs that he faced his support for ground up societal changes never deserted him.

References

Further reading

External links
 
 Moses Harman: A Kansas Portrait from the Kansas State Historical Society
 Moses Harman: The Paradigm of A Male Feminist by Wendy McElroy
 Sex Slavery by Voltairine de Cleyre, an 1890 essay supporting Harman and attacking the institution of marriage

1830 births
1910 deaths
American anarchists
American eugenicists
American male non-fiction writers
American political writers
Anarcha-feminists
Anarchist writers
Feminism and history
Free love advocates
Individualist anarchists
Individualist feminists
Male feminists
People from Valley Falls, Kansas
Schoolteachers from Missouri
Schoolteachers from West Virginia
American publishers (people)